Broighter is a townland in west County Londonderry, Northern Ireland. Broighter is part of Causeway Coast and Glens district.

Broighter Hoard
The Broighter Hoard was discovered in 1896 by two farm labourers, Tomas Nicholl and James Morrow, who were hard at work double ploughing a field for local farmer Joseph L Gibson. The hoard includes a  gold boat, a gold torc and bowl and some other jewellery. A design from the hoard has been used as an image on the 1996 issue of the Northern Ireland British one-pound coins and the gold ship featured in a design on the last Irish one-pound coins. The Broighter Collar and Broighter Ship also featured on definitive postage stamps of Ireland from 1990–1995. The National Museum of Ireland, who now hold the hoard, describe the torc as the "finest example of Irish La Tène goldworking". Replicas of the collection are kept at the Ulster Museum in Belfast.

Transport
Broighter railway station was opened by the Londonderry and Coleraine Railway on 29 December 1852, but closed on 3 July 1950.

See also 
List of townlands in County Londonderry

References 

Townlands of County Londonderry